Pycnopsyche scabripennis, the giant red sedge, is a species of northern caddisfly in the family Limnephilidae.

References

Integripalpia
Articles created by Qbugbot
Insects described in 1842